Keith Lamar Jones (born March 20, 1966) is a former professional American football running back in the National Football League (NFL).  He played four seasons for the Atlanta Falcons from 1989 to 1992.

References

External links 
 

1966 births
Living people
People from St. Louis County, Missouri
Players of American football from Missouri
American football running backs
Illinois Fighting Illini football players
Atlanta Falcons players
Frankfurt Galaxy players
American expatriate sportspeople in Germany